Events from the year 1860 in Russia

Incumbents
 Monarch – Alexander II

Events

 
 
  
  
 St. Petersburg River Yacht Club
 Rēzekne I–Daugavpils Railway
 Circassian Majlis
 State Bank of the Russian Empire

Births

 - Anton Chekhov, Russian playwright and short story writer. (d. 1904)
 1 April - Sergey Reformatsky, Russian chemist (d. 1934)

Deaths

  - Aleksey Khomyakov, Russian theologian, philosopher, poet and amateur artist who co-founded the Slavophile movement. (b. 1804)

References

1860 in Russia
Years of the 19th century in the Russian Empire